Ipomoea obscura, the obscure morning glory or small white morning glory, is a species of the genus Ipomoea. It is native to parts of Africa, Asia, and certain Pacific Islands, and it is present in other areas as an introduced species.

The seed of this plant is toxic if ingested; however, the leaves can be cooked and eaten.

References

External links 

obscura